Bradley, His Book (1896–1897) was an American magazine established by Will H. Bradley in Springfield, Massachusetts, in the late 19th century. Contributors included Richard Harding Davis, Nixon Waterman, Julia Draper Whiting, and others. Its visual style was unusually unified throughout the publication; "posters intended as art mingled with advertisements ... for such consumer goods as lawn sprinklers." Among the artists featured in the magazine were William Snelling Hadaway and Maxfield Parrish.

References

Images

Magazines established in 1896
Magazines disestablished in 1897
Defunct magazines published in the United States
Mass media in Springfield, Massachusetts
Magazines published in Massachusetts
Visual arts magazines published in the United States